The Thomas M. Siebel Center for Computer Science is a $50 million,  integrated research and educational facility designed by Bohlin Cywinski Jackson located on the Urbana campus at the University of Illinois at Urbana-Champaign. The Siebel Center houses the Department of Computer Science of the Grainger College of Engineering . The center has over 225,000 square feet (21,000 m²) of research, office, and laboratory space. The Siebel Center claims to be the first "Computing Habitat", featuring a fully interactive environment and intelligent building system. The facility is equipped with computer-controlled locks, proximity and location sensors, cameras to track room activity, and other sensory and control features.

The building is dedicated to Thomas Siebel in recognition of his donation to the University that funded a portion of the construction.

The building received the Award for Outstanding Engineering Achievement from the Illinois Engineering Council in 2004, and the Honor Award from the Pittsburgh chapter of the American Institute of Architects in 2008.

References

External links
 Floor plans provided by the university

Siebel Center for Computer Science